Alamosa East is an unincorporated community and a census-designated place (CDP) located in and governed by Alamosa County, Colorado, United States. The population of the Alamosa East CDP was 1,453 at the United States Census 2020. The Alamosa post office (Zip code 81101) serves the area.

Geography

Demographics

See also

Outline of Colorado
Index of Colorado-related articles
State of Colorado
Colorado cities and towns
Colorado census designated places
Colorado counties
Alamosa County, Colorado
Great Sand Dunes National Park and Preserve
Mount Blanca
San Luis Valley

References

External links

Alamosa @ Colorado.com
Alamosa @ UncoverColorado.com
Alamosa Convention & Visitors Bureau
Alamosa County website

Census-designated places in Alamosa County, Colorado
Census-designated places in Colorado